Larch Butte is a summit in the U.S. state of Idaho, with an elevation of .

Larch Butte was named after the western larch tree (Larix occidentalis).

References

Mountains of Idaho
Mountains of Clearwater County, Idaho